Elections to Carrickfergus Borough Council were held on 20 May 1981 on the same day as the other Northern Irish local government elections. The election used three district electoral areas to elect a total of 15 councillors.

Election results

Note: "Votes" are the first preference votes.

Districts summary

|- class="unsortable" align="centre"
!rowspan=2 align="left"|Ward
! % 
!Cllrs
! % 
!Cllrs
! %
!Cllrs
! %
!Cllrs
!rowspan=2|TotalCllrs
|- class="unsortable" align="center"
!colspan=2 bgcolor="" | DUP
!colspan=2 bgcolor="" | UUP
!colspan=2 bgcolor="" | Alliance
!colspan=2 bgcolor="white"| Others
|-
|align="left"|Area A
|bgcolor="#D46A4C"|27.4
|bgcolor="#D46A4C"|2
|20.0
|1
|22.2
|1
|30.4
|1
|5
|-
|align="left"|Area B
|34.4
|2
|bgcolor="40BFF5"|35.4
|bgcolor="40BFF5"|2
|25.0
|1
|5.2
|0
|5
|-
|align="left"|Area C
|bgcolor="#D46A4C"|47.1
|bgcolor="#D46A4C"|3
|12.9
|0
|18.3
|1
|21.7
|1
|5
|-
|- class="unsortable" class="sortbottom" style="background:#C9C9C9"
|align="left"| Total
|36.6
|7
|22.6
|3
|21.8
|3
|19.0
|2
|15
|-
|}

Districts results

Area A

1977: 2 x Alliance, 2 x UUP, 1 x United Loyalist
1981: 2 x DUP, 1 x Alliance, 1 x UUP, 1 x United Loyalist
1977-1981 Change: DUP (two seats) gain from Alliance and UUP

Area B

1977: 2 x UUP, 2 x Alliance, 1 x DUP
1981: 2 x UUP, 1 x DUP, 1 x Alliance
1977-1981 Change: DUP gain from Alliance

Area C

1977: 2 x DUP, 1 x Alliance, 1 x UPNI, 1 x UUP
1981: 3 x DUP, 1 x Alliance, 1 x Independent Unionist
1977-1981 Change: DUP gain from UUP, Independent Unionist leaves UPNI

References

Carrickfergus Borough Council elections
Carrickfergus